KTPJ-LP (105.9 FM) is a radio station broadcasting a religious radio format as an affiliate of LifeTalk Radio and 3ABN. Licensed to Pueblo, Colorado, United States, it serves the Pueblo area.  The station is currently owned by the Hope Radio Of Pueblo Corporation.

External links
 

TPJ-LP
TPJ-LP
Three Angels Broadcasting Network radio stations